Ángeles Flórez Peón (born 17 November 1918), known as Maricuela, is a Spanish activist and writer.

Biography
Ángeles Flórez Peón was born in Blimea on 17 November 1918. She began working at age 9, scrubbing floors. This event led to her joining the Socialist Youth in 1936, and after the July coup d'état, she became a militia member in Colloto. She was also a nurse in a field hospital in Gijón. Her nom de guerre, Maricuela, refers to the main character of a 1934 Jacinto Sánchez play entitled ¡Arriba los pobres del mundo!, which Flórez performed in at age 17, when the Spanish Civil War broke out.

Flórez was arrested in October 1937, and initially sentenced to 15 years of imprisonment, although this was later reduced to 9 years. In May 1938, she was transferred to Saturrarán prison in Gipuzkoa, where she remained until she was released on parole in August 1941.

In 1946, Flórez married Graciano Rozada Vallina, who participated in the reorganization of the Spanish Socialist Workers' Party (PSOE) and the Unión General de Trabajadores (UGT) of Asturias. Due to his involvement in these processes, Rozada decided to escape to France in August 1947 at the risk of being arrested. Flórez and their daughter met him in March 1948, after being involved in the death of a group of guerrillas. She remained polically active in exile, and participated in the PSOE's 7th Congress in 1958.

She returned to Spain in 1960 to visit her family and was arrested at the border, although she was allowed to continue her visit to Asturias and then return to France.

In 2014, at age 95, Flórez began using the social network Facebook to share her ideas and political opinions. In addition, to help preserve the history of that era and its generation, in 2013 she published Memorias de Ángeles Flórez Peón 'Maricuela, in which she compiled testimonies from the Revolution of 1934 and the Civil War. In 2018, she presented a book of her memoirs, Las sorpresas de Maricuela, at the Madrid Book Fair.

Recognitions
In October 2016, the Club of 25 paid tribute to Ángeles Flórez, presenting her with an award for "her defense of freedom and democracy," which she received from Diario 16 director Cristina Fallarás. The feminist association presents these awards annually with the objective of "making women and their problems visible". Other recipients included journalist Pepa Bueno and writer Almudena Grandes.

On 21 October 2017, Flórez received the Pozu Fortuna Award, an honor presented annually by the Pozu Fortuna Forum Association in collaboration with the Mieres city council to "those people, organizations, or entities that have distinguished themselves in the achievement of actions or works that enhance the values of humanity, freedom, solidarity, peace, and defense of human rights." The award ceremony took place around the Mieres well, site of one of the largest mass graves in Asturias.

Books
 Memorias de Ángeles Flórez Peón 'Maricuela (2009), José Barreiro Foundation
 Las sorpresas de Maricuela (2013), Ediciones Trea, Gijón,

References

External links
 

1918 births
21st-century Spanish women writers
Exiles of the Spanish Civil War in France
Living people
People from San Martín del Rey Aurelio
Spanish centenarians
Spanish memoirists
Spanish socialists
Women human rights activists
21st-century memoirists
Women centenarians
20th-century Spanish women